English Dissenters or English Separatists were Protestant Christians who separated from the Church of England in the 17th and 18th centuries.

A dissenter (from the Latin dissentire, "to disagree") is one who disagrees in opinion, belief and other matters. English Dissenters opposed state interference in religious matters, and founded their own churches, educational establishments and communities. Some emigrated to the New World, especially to the Thirteen Colonies and Canada. Brownists founded the Plymouth colony. English dissenters played a pivotal role in the spiritual development of the United States and greatly diversified the religious landscape. They originally agitated for a wide-reaching Protestant Reformation of the established Church of England, and they flourished briefly during the Protectorate under Oliver Cromwell.

King James VI of Scotland, I of England and Ireland, had said "no bishop, no king", emphasising the role of the clergy in justifying royal legitimacy. Cromwell capitalised on that phrase, abolishing both upon founding the Commonwealth of England. After the restoration of the monarchy in 1660, the episcopacy was reinstalled and the rights of the Dissenters were limited: the Act of Uniformity 1662 required Anglican ordination for all clergy, and many instead withdrew from the state church. These ministers and their followers came to be known as Nonconformists, though originally this term referred to refusal to use certain vestments and ceremonies of the Church of England, rather than separation from it.

Organised dissenting groups (17th century)

In existence during the English Interregnum (1649–1660):

Anabaptists and Baptists

Anabaptists 

Anabaptist (literally, "baptised again") was a term given to those Reformation Christians who rejected the notion of infant baptism in favour of believer's baptism.

It is generally assumed that during the Interregnum, the Baptists and other dissenting groups absorbed the British Anabaptists. Despite this, evidence suggests that the early relations between Baptists and Anabaptists were quite strained. In 1624, the then five existing Baptist churches of London issued an anathema against the Anabaptists. Even today there is still very little dialogue between Anabaptist organisations (such as the Mennonite World Conference) and the Baptist bodies.

Baptists 

Baptist historian Bruce Gourley outlines four main views of Baptist origins:

 the modern scholarly consensus that the movement traces its origin to the 17th century via the English Separatists,
 the view that it was an outgrowth of the Anabaptist movement of believer's baptism begun in 1525 on the European continent,
 the perpetuity view which assumes that the Baptist faith and practice has existed since the time of Christ, and
 the successionist view, or "Baptist successionism", which argues that Baptist churches actually existed in an unbroken chain since the time of Christ.

Barrowists

Henry Barrowe maintained the right and duty of the Church to carry out necessary reforms without awaiting the permission of the civil power; and advocated congregational independence. He regarded the whole established church order as polluted by the relics of Roman Catholicism, and insisted on separation as essential to pure worship and discipline.

Behmenists

The Behmenists religious movement began on continental Europe and took its ideas from the writings of Jakob Böhme (Behmen being one of the adaptations of his name used in England), a German mystic and theosopher who claimed Divine Revelation. In the 1640s, his works appeared in England and English Behmenists developed. Eventually, some of these merged with the Quakers of the time.

Böhme's writings primarily concerned the nature of sin, evil and redemption. Consistent with Lutheran theology, Böhme believed that humanity had fallen from a state of divine grace into a state of sin and suffering, that the forces of evil included fallen angels who had rebelled against God, and subsequently that God's goal was to restore the world to a state of grace.

However, in some ways, Behmenist belief deviated significantly from traditional Lutheran belief. For example, Böhme rejected the concepts of sola fide and sola gratia.

Brownists

By 1580, Robert Browne had become a leader in the movement for a congregational form of organisation for the Church of England and attempted to set up a separate Congregational Church in Norwich, Norfolk, England. He was arrested but released on the advice of William Cecil, his kinsman. Browne and his companions moved to Middelburg in the Netherlands in 1581. He returned to England in 1585 and to the Church of England, being employed as a schoolmaster and parish priest.

Diggers

The Diggers were an English group of Protestant agrarian communists, begun by Gerrard Winstanley as True Levellers in 1649, who became known as Diggers due to their activities.

Their original name came from their belief in economic equality based upon a specific passage in the Book of Acts. The Diggers tried (by "levelling" real property) to reform the existing social order with an agrarian lifestyle based on their ideas for the creation of small egalitarian rural communities. They were one of a number of nonconformist dissenting groups that emerged around this time.

Enthusiasts

Several Protestant sects of the 16th and 17th centuries were called Enthusiastic. During the years that immediately followed the Glorious Revolution, "enthusiasm" was a British pejorative term for advocacy of any political or religious cause in public. Such "enthusiasm" was seen in the time around 1700 as the cause of the previous century's civil war and its attendant atrocities, and thus it was an absolute social sin to remind others of the war by engaging in enthusiasm. During the 18th century, popular Methodists such as John Wesley or George Whitefield were accused of blind enthusiasm (i.e., fanaticism), a charge against which they defended themselves by distinguishing fanaticism from "religion of the heart".

Familists

The Familia Caritatis ("Family of Love", or the "Familists") were a religious sect that began in continental Europe in the 16th century. Members of this religious group were devout followers of a Dutch mystic named Hendrik Niclaes. The Familists believed that Niclaes was the only person who truly knew how to achieve a state of perfection, and his texts attracted followers in Germany, France, and England.

The Familists were extremely secretive and wary of outsiders. For example, they wished death upon those outside of the Family of Love, and re-marriage after the death of a spouse could only take place between men and women of the same Familist congregation. Additionally, they would not discuss their ideas and opinions with outsiders and sought to remain undetected by ordinary members of society: they tended to be members of an established church so as not to attract suspicion and showed respect for authority.

The group were considered heretics in 16th-century England. Among their beliefs were that there existed a time before Adam and Eve, Heaven and Hell were both present on Earth, and that all things were ruled by nature and not directed by God.

The Familists continued to exist until the middle of the 17th century, when they were absorbed into the Quaker movement.

Fifth Monarchists

The Fifth Monarchists or Fifth Monarchy Men were active from 1649 to 1661 during the Interregnum, following the English Civil Wars of the 17th century. They took their name from a prophecy in the Book of Daniel that four ancient monarchies (Babylonian, Persian, Macedonian, and Roman) would precede Christ's return. They also referred to the year 1666 and its relationship to the biblical Number of the Beast indicating the end of earthly rule by carnal human beings. They were one of a number of Nonconformist dissenting groups that emerged around this time.

Grindletonians

In a sermon preached at St Paul's Cross on 11 February 1627, and published under the title of The White Wolfe, 1627, Stephen Denison, minister of St Katherine Cree in London, charges the 'Gringltonian [sic] familists' with holding nine points of an antinomian tendency. These nine points are repeated from Denison by Pagitt (1645), and glanced at by Ross (1655). 
In 1635 John Webster, curate at Kildwick in North Yorkshire, was before a church court charged with being a Grindletonian, and simultaneously in New England John Winthrop thought that Anne Hutchinson was one. The last known Grindletonian died in the 1680s.

Levellers

The Levellers were a political movement during the English Civil War that emphasised popular sovereignty, extended suffrage, equality before the law and religious tolerance. Levellers tended to hold fast to a notion of "natural rights" that had been violated by the king's side in the civil wars (1642–1651). At the Putney Debates in 1647, Colonel Thomas Rainsborough defended natural rights as coming from the law of God expressed in the Bible.

Muggletonians

The Muggletonians, named after Lodowicke Muggleton, was a small Protestant Christian movement which began in 1651 when two London tailors announced they were the last prophets foretold in the biblical Book of Revelation. The group grew out of the Ranters and in opposition to the Quakers. Muggletonian beliefs include a hostility to philosophical reason, a scriptural understanding of how the universe works and a belief that God appeared directly on this earth as Christ Jesus. A consequential belief is that God takes no notice of everyday events on earth and will not generally intervene until it is to bring the world to an end.

Muggletonians avoided all forms of worship or preaching and, in the past, met only for discussion and socialising amongst members. The movement was egalitarian, apolitical, and pacifist, and resolutely avoided evangelism. Members attained a degree of public notoriety by cursing those who reviled their faith.

Puritans

The Puritans were a significant grouping of English Protestants in the 16th and 17th centuries. Puritanism in this sense was founded by some Marian exiles from the clergy shortly after the accession of Queen Elizabeth I in 1558, as an activist movement within the Church of England. The designation "Puritan" is often used incorrectly, based on the assumption that hedonism and puritanism are antonyms: historically, the word was used to characterise the Protestant group as extremists similar to the Cathari of France, and according to Thomas Fuller in his Church History dated back to 1564. Archbishop Matthew Parker of that time used it and "precisian" with the sense of stickler. T. D. Bozeman therefore uses instead the term precisianist in regard to the historical groups of England and New England.

Philadelphians

The Philadelphians, or the Philadelphian Society, were a Protestant 17th-century religious group in England. They were organised around John Pordage (1607–1681), an Anglican priest from Bradfield, Berkshire, who had been ejected from his parish in 1655 because of differing views, but then reinstated in 1660 during the English Restoration. Pordage was attracted to the ideas of Jakob Böhme, a Lutheran theosophist and Christian mystic.

Quakers

The Quakers were a loosely knit group of teachers that grew out of the Seekers. George Fox's journal attributes the name "Quaker" to a judge in 1650 calling them Quakers "because I bid them tremble before the Lord".

Ranters

The Ranters were a sect in the time of the Commonwealth (1649–1660) who were regarded as heretical by the established Church of that period. Their central idea was pantheistic, that God is essentially in every creature; this led them to deny the authority of the Church, of scripture, of the current ministry and of services, instead calling on men to hearken to Jesus within them. Many Ranters seem to have rejected a belief in immortality and in a personal God, and in many ways they resemble the Brethren of the Free Spirit in the 14th century. The Ranters revived the Brethren of the Free Spirit's beliefs of amoralism and followed the Brethren's ideals which "stressed the desire to surpass the human condition and become godlike". Further drawing from the Brethren of the Free Spirit, the Ranters embraced antinomianism and believed that Christians are freed by grace from the necessity of obeying Mosaic Law. Because they believed that God was present in all living creatures, the Ranters' adherence to antinomianism allowed them to reject the very notion of obedience, thus making them a great threat to the stability of the government.

Sabbatarians

Sabbatarians were known in England from the time of Elizabeth I (1558–1603). Access to the Bible in English allowed anyone who could read English to study scripture and question Church doctrines. First-day Sabbatarians (Sunday Sabbatarians) viewed Sunday as the Christian Sabbath, whereas seventh-day Sabbatarians challenged the Christian day of worship being on Sunday rather than Saturday. Some Dutch Anabaptists embraced Sabbatarianism, and may have helped to introduce these practices into England. Socinians and Reformed Church members were also known to hold Sabbatarian beliefs. Sabbatarian practitioners were also to be found within the Church of England in one form or another. Even the Puritans were known to harbour first-day Sabbatarian views (cf Puritan Sabbatarianism). English Sabbatarianism is generally associated with John Traske (1585–1636), Theophilus Brabourne (1590–1662) and Dorothy Traske (c. 1585–1645), who also played a major role in keeping the early Traskite congregations growing in numbers.

Seekers

The Seekers were not a distinct religion or sect, but instead formed a religious society. Like other Protestant dissenting groups, they believed the Roman Catholic Church to be corrupt, which subsequently applied to the Church of England as well through its common heritage.

Seekers considered all churches and denominations to be in error, and believed that only a new church established by Christ upon his return could possess his grace. Their anticipation of this event was found in their practices. For example, Seekers held meetings as opposed to religious services, and as such had no clergy or hierarchy. During these gatherings they would wait in silence and speak only when felt that God had inspired them to do so.

Furthermore, to this, the Seekers denied the effectiveness of external forms of religion such as the sacraments, baptism and the Scriptures as a means of salvation.

Socinians

The followers of Socinianism were Unitarian or Nontrinitarian in theology and influenced by the Polish Brethren. The Socinians of 17th century England influenced the development of the English Presbyterians, the English Unitarians and the Non-subscribing Presbyterian Church of Ireland.

18th century dissenters
In the 18th century, one group of Dissenters became known as "Rational Dissenters". In many respects they were closer to the Anglicanism of their day than other Dissenting sects; however, they believed that state religions impinged on the freedom of conscience. They were fiercely opposed to the hierarchical structure of the Established Church and the financial ties between it and the government. Like moderate Anglicans, they desired an educated ministry and an orderly church, but they based their opinions on the Bible and on reason rather than on appeals to tradition and authority. They rejected doctrines such as the original sin or Trinity, arguing that they were irrational. Rational Dissenters believed that Christianity and faith could be dissected and evaluated using the newly emerging discipline of science, and that a stronger belief in God would be the result.

Another significant dissenting tradition that emerged at the end of the 18th century is the Swedenborgian church, which continues today in several branches around the world. It originated in London in 1780. Beginning as groups reading Emanuel Swedenborg (1688–1772), whose members were composed largely of Methodists, Baptists, and Anglicans, some of the Swedenborgian enthusiasts became disillusioned with the prospects for thorough Swedenborgian theological reform within their respective traditions. These left those churches to form the General Conference of the New Jerusalem, often called simply the New Church. Other Swedenborgian converts, such as Anglican Rev. John Clowes and Rev. Thomas Hartley, argued for remaining within existing traditions. Swedenborg himself did not call for a new organisation, but for profound theological reform for the existing churches. At the end of his life, he endured a rare Swedish heresy inquiry by the Swedish Lutheran Consistory. He died before it was concluded, and the Consistory shelved the inquiry without reaching a decision. Swedenborg's primary critiques of orthodox theology centred on the tri-personal constructions of the Trinity, the idea of salvation by faith alone, and the vicarious atonement. He revived an allegorical tradition of reading scripture, which he believed was composed in correspondences. He believed in a theory of symbolic values in the literal text, which could produce an inner sense wherein the individual could ascertain the new theology.

Dissenting groups continuing today
Baptists
Congregationalists
Presbyterians (majority in Scotland but classified as dissenters in England, see English Presbyterianism)
other Reformed groups: e.g. United Reformed Church
Quakers
Unitarians and Unitarian Universalists
 Swedenborgians
Anabaptists
Nondenominational Protestants
and others

See also

17th century denominations in England
Christian anarchism
Dissenting academies
Ecclesiastical separatism
English Independents
History of the Puritans in North America
Freedom of religion
Nonconformist
Independent (religion)
Recusancy
Religion in the United Kingdom
Separatists

Notes

References 

 Fitzpatrick, Martin. "Heretical Religion and Radical Political Ideas in Late Eighteenth-Century England." The Transformation of Political Culture: England and Germany in the Late Eighteenth Century. Ed. Eckhart Hellmuth. Oxford: Oxford University Press; London: German Historical Institute, 1990. .
 Mullett, Charles F. "The Legal Position of English Protestant Dissenters, 1689–1767." Virginia Law Review (1937): 389–418. .
 Philip, Mark. "Rational Religion and Political Radicalism." Enlightenment and Dissent 4 (1985): 35–46.
 ExLibris, Early English dissenters

Further reading
Driver, Christopher. A Future for the Free Churches? London: S.C.M. Press, 1962.
 Hahn-Bruckart, Thomas, Dissenters and Nonconformists: Phenomena of Religious Deviance Between the British Isles and the European Continent, EGO - European History Online, Mainz: Institute of European History, 2017, retrieved: 8 March 2021 (pdf).

 
Politics of England
Christian terminology
Christian radicalism